The Rhine-Ruhr Stadtbahn is an umbrella system of all of the Stadtbahn (light rail) lines included in the integrated public transport network of the Verkehrsverbund Rhein-Ruhr (VRR), which covers the Rhine-Ruhr metropolitan area in western Germany. It does not include the Cologne and Bonn Stadtbahn systems, which are integrated in the Verkehrsverbund Rhein-Sieg (VRS).

History
At the beginning of the 1960s, road traffic in the Rhine-Ruhr area increased like in other German metropolitan areas. Existing trams were regarded as obstacles for car-oriented cities. Therefore, these trams should be relocated to underground sections below city centers (as Stadtbahn lines) if they were not replaced by bus lines.

The cities of Bochum, Castrop-Rauxel, Dortmund, Duisburg, Essen, Gelsenkirchen, Herne, Mülheim an der Ruhr, Oberhausen, Recklinghausen and Wattenscheid founded the Stadtbahngesellschaft Ruhr in 1969 for coordinating the plans to transform tram routes into Stadtbahn routes. Düsseldorf and Hattingen joined in 1972; since then, the cooperation has been called Stadtbahngesellschaft Rhein-Ruhr. Witten joined in 1981, Recklinghausen left in 1982.

Original Stadtbahn plans proposed upgrading up to 300 kilometers of tram lines step by step. Most of these proposed lines were planned in north-south direction and would have branched off of a main line that would have run more or less east-west.  Due to financial constraints and the downturn of the economy in the region, many sections or the originally planned system have not been built. As a result, there are isolated standard gauge Stadtbahn lines inside of metre gauge tram systems – one example would be the U35 line in Bochum.

Component systems
There are five Stadtbahn systems that make up the Rhine-Ruhr Stadtbahn (their operating companies are shown in parentheses):

 Bochum Stadtbahn (BOGESTRA) – 1 line
 Dortmund Stadtbahn (Dortmunder Stadtwerke (DSW21)) – 8 lines
 Duisburg Stadtbahn ( (DVG)) – 1 line
 Düsseldorf Stadtbahn (Rheinbahn) – 11 lines
 Essen Stadtbahn (Ruhrbahn) – 3 lines

Lines
, there are 23 lines altogether in the Rhine-Ruhr Stadtbahn:

Infrastructure
All plans included the following standards: 
 intersection-free alignment, in city centres preferred to be underground, in the outskirts also above surface
 high-level platforms for easy access (in contrast to former low-floor platforms or even access from street level)
 European standard gauge
Cross-platform interchanges were planned wherever useful and possible. All Stadtbahn lines have been electrified with overhead catenary and are powered with direct current like former trams.

However, most of Rhine-Ruhr tram lines still use metre gauge. Combined Stadtbahn and tram tracks use three-rail tracks (Essen) or even four-rail tracks (Krefeld). Some sections in Mülheim an der Ruhr, Bochum und Essen were constructed with metre gauge and temporary integrated into the network, being able to be converted easily to standard gauge at a later point of time.

Since the start of Rhine-Ruhr Stadtbahn, existing tram routes were integrated and partly developed as pilot routes. Among others, the former tram lines 8/18 Essen–Mülheim were chosen to become the most important pilot route with tracks in between the Ruhrschnellweg express highway lanes; the new pilot Stadtbahn line U18 was opened in 1977.

Most of today's Stadtbahn lines were developed out of former tram lines. Their line numbers were simply converted into two-digit numbers prepended by U for distinguishing between both standards; the U refers to both unabhängig (engl.: independent) and U-Bahn (metro) standards being the later target, although complete U-Bahn (metro) lines have in fact never existed in the Rhine-Ruhr area. By 2022, the only full independent lines in the Rhine-Ruhr area are the Dortmund H-Bahn, Düsseldorf SkyTrain, Wuppertal Schwebebahn (also referred as line 60 in the Stadtbahn numbering scheme) hanging and suspended monorails, the U18 line in Essen and U46 in Dortmund.

Developments
The very ambitious original plans have not paid enough attention to financial restrictions and increased tunneling costs in the mining areas. So, the schedule for opening the planned sections has been severely delayed with some routes even cancelled. The next step to transform Stadtbahn routes to metro standards is no longer foreseen.

To use of constructed sections, existing tram lines have been operated further on the new alignments including temporary use of tram gauges and low-floor platforms. Some stations even contain both low-floor and high-floor platforms in case of mixed tram and Stadtbahn operation.

Rolling stock
For the Rhine-Ruhr Stadtbahn, new standardised Stadtbahn trains named Stadtbahnwagen B were developed. However, Stadtbahn companies ordered them with different lengths, layout of doors etc..

Tram lines still use former rolling stock and new low-floor trams where Stadtbahn projects were stopped or severely delayed.

Routes of Rhine-Ruhr Stadtbahn

See also
 Bochum Stadtbahn (BOGESTRA)
 Dortmund Stadtbahn
 Düsseldorf Stadtbahn (see also: Rheinbahn)
 Essen: Public Transport (incl. Essen Stadtbahn)
 Verkehrsverbund Rhein-Ruhr (VRR)

External links
Urbanrail.net – Rhein-Ruhr Stadtbahn systems
Jochen Schönfisch – Rhein-Ruhr Stadtbahn (in German)
Metro Bits – Picture gallery about neighbouring Rhein-Ruhr-Sieg Stadtbahn
Christian Stade – Track maps of German public transport systems

Light rail in Germany
Tram transport in Germany
Underground rapid transit in Germany
Metre gauge railways in Germany